Chŏngbang station is a railway station located in Sariwŏn, North Hwanghae province, North Korea. It is on located on the P'yŏngbu Line, which was formed from part of the Kyŏngŭi Line to accommodate the shift of the capital from Seoul to P'yŏngyang; though this line physically connects P'yŏngyang to Pusan via Dorasan, in operational reality it ends at Kaesŏng due to the Korean Demilitarized Zone.

Originally called Kyedong station, the station was opened by the Chosen Government Railway on 1 July 1923. It is located near the well-known tourist sites of Mt. Chŏngbang, Chŏngbang Fortress and the Sŏngbul-sa Buddhist temple.

References

Railway stations in North Korea
Buildings and structures in North Hwanghae Province
Sariwon
Railway stations opened in 1923
1923 establishments in Korea